Yponomeuta albonigratus is a moth of the family Yponomeutidae. It is found in Tajikistan, Uzbekistan, Kyrghyzstan and is also recorded from the Levant.

Larvae have been recorded on Salicaceae species (Salix oxycarpa)

References

External links
 New Records Of Yponomeutoid Moths (Lepidoptera, Yponomeutidae, Plutellidae) From Israel

Yponomeutidae
Moths of the Middle East
Moths described in 1972